Isaac Espinal (born June 10, 2005) is an American soccer player who plays as a midfielder for Loudoun United in the USL Championship.

Career

Youth 
Espinal joined the D.C. United youth academy in 2017 and played in the U.S. Soccer Development Academy and MLS Next with the club.

Senior 
On March 19, 2022, Espinal made his debut for Loudoun United FC, the reserve team of D.C. United, in a 3–0 victory against New York Red Bulls II in the USL Championship. Espinal came on in the 73rd minute and played the final 17 minutes of the match. On July 22, 2022, Espinal signed a professional contract with Loudoun.

Career statistics

Club

Personal life 
Espinal is of Honduran descent. His older brother, Darwin, is also a professional footballer, who plays for the Maryland Bobcats of the National Independent Soccer Association.

References 

2005 births
Living people
American people of Honduran descent
Association football midfielders
Loudoun United FC players
People from Burke, Virginia
Soccer players from Virginia
USL Championship players
American soccer players